Piturie is an outback locality in the Shire of Boulia, Queensland, Australia. The town of Urandangi is within the locality.

Geography 
Piturie is in the Channel Country. All watercourses in this area are part of the Lake Eyre drainage basin, and most will dry up before their water reaches Lake Eyre.

The predominant land use is grazing on native vegetation.

History 
Waluwarra (also known as Warluwarra, Walugara, and Walukara) is an Australian Aboriginal language of Western Queensland. Its traditional language region is the local government area of Shire of Boulia, including Walgra Station and Wolga, from Roxborough Downs north to Carandotta Station and Urandangi on the Georgina River, on Moonah Creek to Rochedale, south-east of Pituri Creek.

Education 
Urandangi State School is a government primary (Early Childhood-6) school for boys and girls on the Urandangi North Road. It had only 8 students enrolled in 2015. In 2018, the school had an enrolment of 8 students with 2 teachers and 2 non-teaching staff (1 full-time equivalent).

There are no secondary schools in Urandangi. The nearest secondary school is in Mount Isa but too far for a daily commute. The Spinifex State College in Mount Isa offers boarding facilities. Other boarding schools or distance education would be options.

References 

Shire of Boulia
Localities in Queensland